"Love Is a Long Road" is a song by Tom Petty from his 1989 first solo album Full Moon Fever. Although only released as the B-side to "Free Fallin'" in the UK, and not released as a stand-alone single, it received a fair amount of radio airplay. In the US, it peaked at No. 7 on the Billboard Album Rock Tracks chart.

Song information and other releases
The rock song was co-written by guitarist Mike Campbell, who was inspired by a motorcycle he owned. The musician told "I was really into that frame of mind. This feels like a motorcycle shifting gears."

"Love Is a Long Road" appears on the 2000 double-disc compilation album Anthology: Through the Years, as well as on the 1995 box set Playback.

Live performance
The song became quite popular as a live track, and was played 174 times in concert. However, it didn't appear on Petty's last tour, as it was performed for the last time in 2013.

Review
Another one of Petty's late-1980s songs which looks back at a fractured romance, AllMusic describes the song as sounding like a stripped-down version of the Who's classics "Baba O' Riley" and "Won't Get Fooled Again", and one of the most powerful rockers on the album. Rolling Stone ranked the song at No. 38 in a list of Petty's 100 greatest songs.

Charts

References

1989 songs
Tom Petty songs
Songs written by Tom Petty